Gonzalo López Marañón (3 October 1933 – 7 May 2016) was a Roman Catholic bishop.

Ordained to the priesthood in 1957, López Marañón served as bishop of the Apostolic Vicariate of San Miguel de Sucumbíos, Ecuador from 1984 until 2010.

See also

Notes

1933 births
2016 deaths
20th-century Roman Catholic bishops in Ecuador
21st-century Roman Catholic bishops in Ecuador
Roman Catholic bishops of San Miguel de Sucumbíos